Wilson Township is one of ten townships in Adair County, Missouri, United States. As of the 2010 census, its population was 503. It is named for Joseph Wilson, an early judge in Adair County.

Geography
It contains one cemetery, Gibbs Union.

References

 USGS Geographic Names Information System (GNIS)

External links
 US-Counties.com
 City-Data.com

Townships in Adair County, Missouri
Kirksville micropolitan area, Missouri
Townships in Missouri